Guigang (Zhuang: Gveigangj) is a prefecture-level city in eastern Guangxi in the People's Republic of China. Prior to 1988, it was known as Gui County or Guixian.

Geography and climate
Guigang is located in eastern Guangxi. It is located between Guangxi's five major cities: Nanning, Guilin, Liuzhou, Beihai, and Wuzhou. Its location makes it a major transportation and business hub, connecting central China with the south, especially Hong Kong and Macau. Guigang has a rail line, several major highways, an expressway, and most importantly a large port on the Xi River, its direct connection to the Pearl River Delta.

Administration
Guigang has 1 county-level city, 3 urban districts, and 1 counties.

Districts:
 Gangbei District
 Gangnan District
 Qintang District

County-level city:
 Guiping

County:
 Pingnan

Demographics
As of the 2020 Chinese census, its population was 4,316,262 inhabitants whom 1,277,231 lived in the built-up (or metro) area made of Gangbei and Gangnan Districts, Qintang District not being conurbated yet.
Guigang's population is mainly Cantonese Chinese along with a number of minority tribes.

Economy
The 2015 GDP was 86.5 billion yuan; nominal GDP per capita was roughly $2,400, making it a relatively poor county in southern China. Transportation, shipping, and logistics are a vital part of Guigang's economy. More than 100 million tons of goods pass through its ports in one year. Major industries include chemical manufacturing, pharmaceuticals, metallurgy, tannery, textiles, printing, and food stuffs. Agriculture is also important with major crops including cereals such as rice and corn, sugar, medicinal herbs, tobacco, tea, lotus root, and green vegetables.

Sports

The Guigang Sports Centre Stadium is located in Guigang. It has a capacity of 30,000 and it is used mostly for football matches. The venue opened on 21 June 2016.

Twin towns and sister cities
 Nakhon Si Thammarat, Thailand (2016)

References

External links
Xinhua Website  

 
Cities in Guangxi
Prefecture-level divisions of Guangxi